Main is a surname. People with it include:
 Alan Main, Scottish football goalkeeper
 Alexander H. Main. American politician
 Anne Main, British politician
 Bert Main, Australian zoologist
 Charles T. Main, American engineer
 Frank Main (born 1964), American journalist
 George Washington Main (1807–1836) Alamo defender
 George Main (horse racing) (1879–1948), Australian pastoralist and horse breeder, chairman of the Australian Jockey Club
 Grant Main, Canadian rower
 Jack Main (John Alfred Main 1876–1945), Australian rules footballer
 James Main, Scottish football player
 John Main, British Benedictine monk
 Marjorie Main, American actress
 Oliver Main, member of the Pigeon Detectives
 Robert Main, British astronomer
 Sandy Main, Scottish football player
 Terence Main (born 1954), American modernist sculptor
 Willett Main, American politician

See also
 Main (disambiguation)
 Maine (disambiguation)
 Mayne (disambiguation)

Scottish surnames